Iaceornis is a prehistoric marine bird genus endemic to North America during the Late Cretaceous living about 83.5 mya. It is known from a single fossil specimen found in Gove County, Kansas (USA), and consisting of a partial skeleton lacking a skull.

Since it was first discovered by Othniel Charles Marsh in 1877, the specimen (YPM 1734) was long considered to belong to the contemporary species Apatornis celer. Because it is relatively complete, most discussions of Apatornis actually focused on the Iaceornis fossil. In 2004, paleontologist Julia A. Clarke showed that the skeleton actually differed in important characteristics of the wing bones from the true, holotype specimen of Apatornis. Therefore, she assigned the more complete remains to a new genus and species, Iaceornis marshi, meaning "Marsh's neglected bird".

In Clarke's phylogenetic analysis, she found that Iaceornis is more advanced than Ichthyornis but less advanced than modern birds.

References

Bird genera
Prehistoric ornithurans
Late Cretaceous birds of North America